This is a bibliography of the books written or edited by Isaac Asimov, arranged alphabetically. Asimov was a prolific author, and he engaged in many collaborations with other authors. This list may not yet be complete. The total number of books listed here is over 500.  Asimov died in 1992 at age 72; a small number of his books were published posthumously.

A
 ABC's of Ecology
 ABC's of Space
 ABC's of the Earth
 ABC's of the Ocean
 Adding a Dimension
 All the Troubles of the World
 Alpha Centauri, the Nearest Star
 The Alternate Asimovs
 Amazing Stories: Sixty Years of the Best Science Fiction
 Ancient Astronomy
 Animals of the Bible
 The Annotated 'Gulliver's Travels'
 The Asimov Chronicles
 Asimov Laughs Again
 Asimov on Astronomy
 Asimov on Chemistry
 Asimov on Numbers
 Asimov on Physics
 Asimov on Science
 Asimov on Science Fiction
 Asimov's Annotated 'Don Juan'
 Asimov's Annotated Gilbert and Sullivan
 Asimov's Annotated 'Paradise Lost'
 Asimov's Biographical Encyclopedia of Science and Technology
 Asimov's Biographical Encyclopedia of Science and Technology, 2D Ed.
 Asimov's Biographical Encyclopedia of Science and Technology, 3D Ed.
 Asimov's Chronology of Science and Discovery
 Asimov's Chronology of the World
 Asimov's Galaxy: Reflections on Science Fiction
 Asimov's Guide to Halley's Comet
 Asimov's Guide to Science
 Asimov's Guide to Shakespeare, Volume One
 Asimov's Guide to Shakespeare, Volume Two
 Asimov's Guide to the Bible, Volume One
 Asimov's Guide to the Bible, Volume Two
 Asimov's Mysteries
 Asimov's New Guide to Science
 Asimov's Sherlockian Limericks
 The Asteroids
 Astronomy Today
 Atlantis
 Atom: Journey Across the Subatomic Cosmos
 Authorised Murder (Originally published as Murder at the ABA)
 Azazel (1988)

B
 Baker's Dozen: Thirteen Short Fantasy Novels
 Baker's Dozen: Thirteen Short Science Fiction Novels
 Banquets of the Black Widowers
 Before the Golden Age
 The Beginning and the End
 Beginnings: The Story of Origins, of Mankind, Life, the Earth, the Universe
 The Best Mysteries of Isaac Asimov
 The Best New Thing
 The Best of Isaac Asimov
 The Best Science Fiction of Isaac Asimov
 The Bicentennial Man and Other Stories
 The Big Apple Mysteries
 Biochemistry and Human Metabolism
 The Birth and Death of Stars
 The Birth of the United States, 1763–1816
 Breakthroughs in Science
 Building Blocks of the Universe
 Buy Jupiter and Other Stories

C

 Cal See also Robot series (Asimov)
 Casebook of the Black Widowers
 Catastrophes!
 Caught in the Organ Draft
 The Caves of Steel (1954), See also Robot series (Asimov)
 Change!
 The Chemicals of Life
 Chemistry and Human Health
 Child of Time (with Robert Silverberg, UK title of The Ugly Little Boy)
 A Choice of Catastrophes
 Christopher Columbus: Navigator to the New World
 The Clock We Live on
 The Collapsing Universe
 Colonizing the Planets and Stars
 Comets
 Comets and Meteors
 The Complete Robot (1982), See also Robot series (Asimov)
 The Complete Science Fair Handbook
 The Complete Stories Vol. 1
 The Complete Stories Vol. 2
 Computer Crimes and Capers
 Constantinople, the Forgotten Empire
 Cosmic Critiques: How and Why Ten Science Fiction Stories Work
 Cosmic Knights
 Counting the Eons
 Creations
 The Currents of Space
 Curses

D
 The Dangers of Intelligence and Other Essays
 The Dark Ages
 David Starr, Space Ranger (as Paul French)
 The Death Dealers (later republished as A Whiff of Death)
 Devils
 Did Comets Kill the Dinosaurs?
 The Disappearing Man and Other Mysteries
 The Double Planet
 Dragon Tales
 The Dream, Benjamin's Dream & Benjamin's Bicentennial Blast

E
 The Early Asimov
 Earth Is Room Enough
 Earth: Our Crowded Spaceship
 Earth: Our Home Base
 The Earth's Moon
 An Easy Introduction to the Slide Rule
 The Edge of Tomorrow
 The Egyptians
 Election Day 2084: Science Fiction Stories on the Politics of the Future (edited by Isaac Asimov and Martin H. Greenberg)
 Electricity and Man
 Encounters
 The End of Eternity
 The Ends of the Earth
 Environments Out There
 The Evitable Conflict
 The Exploding Suns
 Exploring the Earth and the Cosmos
 Extraterrestrial Civilizations
 Eyes on the Universe

F
 Fact and Fancy
 Faeries
 Familiar Poems, Annotated
 Fantastic Creatures
 Fantastic Reading: Stories and Activities for Grades 5–8
 Fantastic Voyage
 Fantastic Voyage II: Destination Brain
 Far as Human Eye Could See
 Ferdinand Magellan: Opening the Door to World Exploration
 Fifty Short Science Fiction Tales
 Flying Saucers
 Forward the Foundation
 Foundation
 Foundation and Earth
 Foundation and Empire
 Foundation's Edge
 Franchise
 From Earth to Heaven
 Frontiers II: More Recent Discoveries about Life, Earth, Space, and the Universe
 Frontiers: New Discoveries about Man and His Planet, Outer Space and the Universe (essays originally published in The Los Angeles Times)
 The Future I (with Martin H. Greenberg and Charles G. Waugh)
 The Future in Question
 The Future in Space
 Futuredays: A Nineteenth Century Vision of the Year 2000 (1986) (based on En L'An 2000)

G
 Galaxies
 The Genetic Code
 The Genetic Effects of Radiation
 Ghosts
 Giants
 Ginn Science Program (Advanced A, Advanced B, Intermediate A, Intermediate B, Intermediate C)
 The Gods Themselves
 Gold
 The Golden Door: The United States from 1865 to 1918
 Good Taste
 Great Ideas of Science
 Great Science Fiction Stories by the World's Great Scientists
 The Greeks: A Great Adventure
 A Grossery of Limericks (with John Ciardi)

H
 Hallucination Orbit
 Have You Seen These?
 The Heavenly Host
 Henry Hudson: Arctic Explorer and North American Adventurer
 The History of Biology (chart)
 The History of Chemistry (chart)
 The History of Mathematics (chart)
 The History of Physics
 Hound Dunnit
 How Did We Find Out about (Our) Genes?
 How Did We Find Out about Antarctica?
 How Did We Find Out about Atoms?
 How Did We Find Out about Black Holes?
 How Did We Find Out about Blood?
 How Did We Find Out about Coal?
 How Did We Find Out about Comets?
 How Did We Find Out about Computers?
 How Did We Find Out about Dinosaurs?
 How Did We Find Out about DNA?
 How Did We Find Out about Earthquakes?
 How Did We Find Out about Electricity?
 How Did We Find Out about Energy?
 How Did We Find Out about Germs?
 How Did We Find Out about Lasers?
 How Did We Find Out about Life in the Deep Sea?
 How Did We Find Out about Microwaves?
 How Did We Find Out about Neptune?
 How Did We Find Out about Nuclear Power?
 How Did We Find Out about Numbers?
 How Did We Find Out about Oil?
 How Did We Find Out about Our Human Roots?
 How Did We Find Out about Outer Space?
 How Did We Find Out about Photosynthesis?
 How Did We Find Out about Pluto?
 How Did We Find Out about Robots?
 How Did We Find Out about Solar Power?
 How Did We Find Out about Sunshine?
 How Did We Find Out about Superconductivity?
 How Did We Find Out about the Atmosphere?
 How Did We Find Out about the Beginnings of Life?
 How Did We Find Out about the Brain?
 How Did We Find Out about the Speed of Light?
 How Did We Find Out about the Universe?
 How Did We Find Out about Vitamins
 How Did We Find Out about Volcanoes?
 How Did We Find Out the Earth Is Round?
 How to Enjoy Writing: A Book of Aid and Comfort
 How Was the Universe Born?
 The Hugo Winners
 The Hugo Winners Volume Two
 The Hugo Winners Volume Three
 The Hugo Winners Volume Four
 The Hugo Winners Volume Five
 The Human Body
 The Human Brain

I
 I, Robot: The Illustrated Screenplay (with Harlan Ellison)
 I, Robot (1950), See also Robot series (Asimov)
 I. Asimov: A Memoir
 In Joy Still Felt
 In Memory Yet Green
 In the Beginning
 Inside the Atom
 Inside the Atom (3rd revised edition)
 The Intelligent Man's Guide to Science
 Intergalactic Empires
 Invasions
 Is Anyone There?
 Is Our Planet Warming Up?
 Is There Life on Other Planets?
 Isaac Asimov Presents from Harding to Hiroshima
 Isaac Asimov Presents Superquiz
 Isaac Asimov Presents Superquiz 2
 Isaac Asimov Presents Superquiz 3
 Isaac Asimov Presents Superquiz 4
 Isaac Asimov Presents Tales of the Occult
 Isaac Asimov Presents The Best Crime Stories of the 19th Century
 Isaac Asimov Presents The Best Fantasy of the 19th Century
 Isaac Asimov Presents The Best Horror and Supernatural Stories of the 19th Century
 Isaac Asimov Presents The Best Science Fiction Firsts
 Isaac Asimov Presents The Best Science Fiction of the 19th Century
 Isaac Asimov Presents The Golden Years of Science Fiction: 36 Stories and Novellas
 Isaac Asimov Presents The Golden Years of Science Fiction, Second Series
 Isaac Asimov Presents The Golden Years of Science Fiction, Third Series
 Isaac Asimov Presents The Golden Years of Science Fiction, Fourth Series
 Isaac Asimov Presents The Golden Years of Science Fiction, Fifth Series
 Isaac Asimov Presents The Golden Years of Science Fiction, Sixth Series
 Isaac Asimov Presents The Great SF Stories 1 (1939)
 Isaac Asimov Presents The Great SF Stories 2 (1940)
 Isaac Asimov Presents The Great SF Stories 3 (1941)
 Isaac Asimov Presents The Great SF Stories 4 (1942)
 Isaac Asimov Presents The Great SF Stories 5 (1943)
 Isaac Asimov Presents The Great SF Stories 6 (1944)
 Isaac Asimov Presents The Great SF Stories 7 (1945)
 Isaac Asimov Presents The Great SF Stories 8 (1946)
 Isaac Asimov Presents The Great SF Stories 9 (1947)
 Isaac Asimov Presents The Great SF Stories 10 (1948)
 Isaac Asimov Presents The Great SF Stories 11 (1949)
 Isaac Asimov Presents The Great SF Stories 12 (1950)
 Isaac Asimov Presents The Great SF Stories 13 (1951)
 Isaac Asimov Presents The Great SF Stories 14 (1952)
 Isaac Asimov Presents The Great SF Stories 15 (1953)
 Isaac Asimov Presents The Great SF Stories 16 (1954)
 Isaac Asimov Presents The Great SF Stories 17 (1955)
 Isaac Asimov Presents The Great SF Stories 18 (1956)
 Isaac Asimov Presents The Great SF Stories 19 (1957)
 Isaac Asimov Presents The Great SF Stories 20 (1958)
 Isaac Asimov Presents The Great SF Stories 21 (1959)
 Isaac Asimov Presents The Great SF Stories 22 (1960)
 Isaac Asimov Presents The Great SF Stories 23 (1961)
 Isaac Asimov Presents The Great SF Stories 24 (1962)
 Isaac Asimov Presents The Great SF Stories 25 (1963)
 Isaac Asimov's Book of Facts
 Isaac Asimov's Book of Science and Nature Quotations
 Isaac Asimov's Guide to Earth and Space
 Isaac Asimov's Limericks for Children
 Isaac Asimov's Science Fiction and Fantasy Story-A-Month 1989 Calendar
 Isaac Asimov's Science Fiction Treasury
 Isaac Asimov's Treasury of Humor
 It's Such a Beautiful Day

J
 Jupiter, the Largest Planet
 Jupiter, the Spotted Giant

K
 The Key Word and Other Mysteries
 Kinetics of the Reaction Inactivation of Tyrosinase During Its Catalysis of the Aerobic Oxidation of Catechol (Asimov's doctoral dissertation)
 The Kingdom of the Sun (1960, history of astronomy)
 The Kite that Won the Revolution

L
 The Land of Canaan
 The Last Man on Earth
 Laughing Space, with Janet Jeppson
 Lecherous Limericks
 The Left Hand of the Electron
 Library of the Universe (32 astronomy volumes, ages 9–12)
Ancient Astronomy
The Asteroids
Astronomy Today
The Birth and Death of Stars
Colonizing the Planets and Stars
Comets and Meteors
Did Comets Kill the Dinosaurs?
Earth: Our Home Base
The Earth's Moon
The Future in Space
How Was The Universe Born?
Is There Life on Other Planets?
Jupiter: The Spotted Giant
Mars: Our Mysterious Neighbor
Mercury: The Quick Planet
Mythology and the Universe
Neptune: The Farthest Giant
Our Milky Way and Other Galaxies
Our Solar System
Piloted Space Flights
Pluto: A Double Planet?
Quasars, Pulsars and Black Holes
Rockets, Probes, and Satellites
Saturn: The Ringed Beauty
Science Fiction, Science Fact
Space Garbage
The Space Spotter's Guide
The Sun
Unidentified Flying Objects
Uranus: The Sideways Planet
Venus: A Shrouded Mystery
The World's Space Programs
 Life and Energy
 Life and Time
 Light
 Limericks: Too Gross, with John Ciardi
 Little Treasury of Dinosaurs (5 Vols.)
 Living in the Future
 The Living River (or The Bloodstream: River Of Life)
 Lucky Starr and the Big Sun of Mercury, as Paul French
 Lucky Starr and the Moons of Jupiter, (as Paul French)
 Lucky Starr and the Oceans of Venus, (as Paul French)
 Lucky Starr and the Pirates of the Asteroids, (as Paul French)
 Lucky Starr and the Rings of Saturn, (as Paul French)

M
 Machines That Think
 Magic: The Final Fantasy Collection
 Magical Wishes
 The Mammoth Book of Classic Science Fiction
 The Mammoth Book of Fantastic Science Fiction
 The Mammoth Book of Golden Age Science Fiction
 The Mammoth Book of Modern Science Fiction
 The Mammoth Book of New World Science Fiction
 The Mammoth Book of Vintage Science Fiction
 The March of the Millennia: A Key to Looking at History
 Mars, the Red Planet
 Mars: Our Mysterious Neighbor
 Mars
 The Martian Way and Other Stories
 Measure of the Universe
 Mercury: The Quick Planet
 Microcosmic Tales
 Miniature Mysteries
 Monsters
 The Moon
 More Lecherous Limericks
 More Tales of the Black Widowers
 More Words of Science
 Murder at the ABA
 Murder on the Menu
 Mythical Beasties
 Mythology and the Universe

N
 The Naked Sun (1957), See also Robot series (Asimov)
 The Near East: 10,000 Years of History
 Nebula Award Stories Eight
 Nemesis
 Neptune: The Farthest Giant
 The Neutrino
 The New Hugo Winners, Vol. 2
 The New Hugo Winners
 The New Intelligent Man's Guide to Science
 Nightfall (with Robert Silverberg)
 Nightfall and Other Stories
 Nine Tomorrows
 The Noble Gases, The
 Norby and the Court Jester
 Norby and the Invaders
 Norby and the Lost Princess
 Norby and the Oldest Dragon
 Norby and the Queen's Necklace
 Norby and Yobo's Great Adventure
 Norby Down to Earth
 Norby Finds a Villain
 Norby, the Mixed-Up Robot
 Norby's Other Secret

O
 Of Matters Great and Small
 Of Time and Space and Other Things
 One Hundred Great Fantasy Short-Short Stories
 One Hundred Great Science Fiction Short-Short Stories
 Only a Trillion
 Opus 100
 Opus 200
 Opus 300
 Other Worlds of Isaac Asimov
 Our Angry Earth
 Our Federal Union: The United States from 1816 to 1865
 Our Milky Way and Other Galaxies
 Our Solar System
 Our World in Space
 Out of the Everywhere

P
 Past, Present, and Future
 Pebble in the Sky
 Photosynthesis
 Piloted Space Flights
 The Planet That Wasn't
 Planets for Man (with Stephen H. Dole), Originally Habitable Planets for man.
 Please Explain
 Pluto: A Double Planet?
 The Positronic Man (1992, with Robert Silverberg), See also Robot series (Asimov)
 Prelude to Foundation
 Purr-Fect Crime
 Puzzles of the Black Widowers

Q
 Quasar, Quasar, Burning Bright
 Quasars, Pulsars, and Black Holes
 Quick and Easy Math

R
 Races and People
 Raintree Reading, Series 1
 Raintree Reading, Series 2
 Raintree Reading, Series 3
 Realm of Algebra
 Realm of Measure
 Realm of Numbers
 The Relativity of Wrong
 The Rest of the Robots
 The Return of the Black Widowers
 The Road to Infinity
 Robbie
 Robot Dreams (1986), See also Robot series (Asimov)
 Robot Visions
 Robots
 Robots and Empire (1985), See also Robot series (Asimov)
 Robots from Asimov's
 The Robots of Dawn (1983), See also Robot series (Asimov)
 Robots: Machines in Man's Image
 Rockets, Probes, and Satellites
 The Roman Empire
 The Roman Republic
 The Roving Mind

S
 Sally
 Satellites in Outer Space
 Saturn and Beyond
 Saturn: The Ringed Beauty
 Science Fiction A to Z
 Science Fiction by Asimov
 The Science Fiction Weight-Loss Book
 Science Fiction, Science Fact
 The Science Fictional Olympics (edited by Isaac Asimov, Martin Harry Greenberg and Charles G Waugh)
 The Science Fictional Solar System (edited by Isaac Asimov, Martin Harry Greenberg and Charles G Waugh)
 Science Past—Science Future
 Science, Numbers and I
 The Search for the Elements
 Second Foundation
 The Secret of the Universe
 Senior Sleuths: A Large Print Anthology of Mysteries and Puzzlers
 The Sensuous Dirty Old Man
 Seven Cardinal Virtues of Science Fiction
 The Seven Deadly Sins of Science Fiction
 The Shaping of England
 The Shaping of France
 The Shaping of North America: From Earliest Times to 1763
 Sherlock Holmes through Time and Space
 A Short History of Biology
 A Short History of Chemistry
 Show Business is Murder
 The Solar System and Back
 The Solar System
 Space Garbage
 Space Mail
 Space Mail, Volume II
 Space Shuttles
 The Space Spotter's Guide
 Speculations
 Spells
 The Sport of Crime
 The Stars in Their Courses
 The Stars, Like Dust
 Stars
 Starships
 Still More Lecherous Limericks
 The Story of Ruth 1972
 The Subatomic Monster
 The Sun
 The Sun Shines Bright
 Supermen
 The Science Fictional Solar System

T
 Tales of the Black Widowers
 Tantalizing Locked Room Mysteries
 Think about Space: Where Have We Been and Where Are We Going?
 The Thirteen Crimes of Science Fiction
 Thirteen Horrors of Halloween
 Those Amazing Electronic Thinking Machines
 Three by Asimov
 Through a Glass, Clearly
 Tin Stars
 To the Ends of the Universe
 Today and Tomorrow And--
 Tomorrow's Children
 Towards Tomorrow
 The Tragedy of the Moon
 TV: 2000
 The Twelve Crimes of Christmas
 The Twelve Frights of Christmas
 Twentieth Century Discovery
 The Tyrannosaurus Prescription and One Hundred Other Science Essays

U
 The Ugly Little Boy (with Robert Silverberg)
 Understanding Physics, Volume One: Motion, Sound and Heat	
 Understanding Physics, Volume Two: Light, Magnetism and Electricity	
 Understanding Physics, Volume Three: The Electron, Proton, and Neutron	
 Unidentified Flying Objects
 The Union Club Mysteries
 The Universe From Flat Earth to Quasar
 Uranus: The Sideways Planet

V
 Venus, Near Neighbor of the Sun
 Venus: A Shrouded Mystery
 View from a Height
 Views of the Universe
 Visions of Fantasy: Tales from the Masters
 Visions of the Universe

W
 The Wellsprings of Life
 What Causes Acid Rain?
 What Is a Shooting Star?
 What Is an Eclipse?
 What Makes the Sun Shine?
 What's Happening to the Ozone Layer?
 Where Do We Go from Here?
 Where Does Garbage Go?
 A Whiff of Death (originally published as The Death Dealers)
 Who Done It?
 Why Are Animals Endangered?
 Why Are Some Beaches Oily?
 Why Are the Rain Forests Vanishing?
 Why Are Whales Vanishing?
 Why Do Stars Twinkle?
 Why Do We Have Different Seasons?
 Why Does Litter Cause Problems?
 Why Does the Moon Change Shape?
 Why Is the Air Dirty?
 The Winds of Change and Other Stories
 Witches
 Wizards
 Words from History
 Words from the Exodus
 Words from the Myths
 Words in Genesis
 Words of Science and the History behind Them
 Words on the Map
 The World of Carbon
 The World of Nitrogen
 The World's Space Programs
 Worlds within Worlds

X
 'X' Stands for Unknown

Y
 Young Extraterrestrials
 Young Ghosts
 Young Monsters
 Young Mutants
 Young Star Travelers
 Young Witches and Warlocks
 Yours, Isaac Asimov

See also
 Isaac Asimov bibliography (categorical)
 Isaac Asimov bibliography (chronological)
 Isaac Asimov book series bibliography
 Isaac Asimov short stories bibliography

References

External links
 Asimov Online
 
 The Fiction of Isaac Asimov - Part I and Part II at The Internet Time Travel Database
 Jenkins’ Spoiler-Laden Guide to Isaac Asimov
 

 
Bibliographies by writer
Bibliographies of American writers
Science fiction bibliographies